Shuanghu County, also transliterated from Tibetan as Co Nyi County (Co'nyi;), is a county under the jurisdiction of the prefecture-level city of Nagqu, in the northernmost part of the Tibet Autonomous Region, People's Republic of China. It was formed in 2012, combining the territory of the former Shuanghu Special District with the eastern half of Nyima County. Much of the county is within the Changtang area.

Introduction
Shuanghu  (Tibetan Tshonyi; mtsho gnyis) translates to  "two lakes".
Shuanghu County is at very high elevation, mostly above 5,000 meters above sea level, and very sparsely populated (averaging around 0.12 people per square kilometre, but concentrated in the southern portion of the county). 
The vast majority of its population practices nomadic pastoralism (mostly goats and sheep).
The climate is very rough, cold and dry. There is a weather station in Shuanghu, established in 1999, which on average measures negative temperatures (Celsius scale) throughout the year. The highest temperature on record is +2.3 °C (July 2000), the lowest −62.4 °C (January 2006).

Administrative divisions

The county comprises seven town-level divisions:
the administrative center at Cuozheluomazhen (Cozhêlhoma, Soggarluma) 措折罗玛镇, and the six townships
Xibdê 协德乡,
Yagqu 雅曲乡,
Garco 嘎措乡
Cozhêdangma 措折强玛乡,
Domar 多玛乡,
Parling 巴岭乡.

See also
Changtang
Kunlun Mountains
Dagze Lake
Lake Urru
Purog Kangri Glacier
Puruogangri

References

External links
World's highest county established in Tibet, China.org.cn, July 26, 2013.

Counties of Tibet
Nagqu